Ixhelt González (born June 1, 2004) an American wheelchair basketball player and a member of the United States women's national wheelchair basketball team. She represented the United States at the 2020 Summer Paralympics.

Career 
At the age of 13, González represented the United States at the 2018 Wheelchair Basketball World Championship and finished in sixth place in the tournament. She was the youngest member on the team. González represented the United States at the 2020 Summer Paralympics in the wheelchair basketball women's tournament and won a bronze medal.

Personal life 
González attends St. Francis de Sales High School in Chicago, Illinois. She was diagnosed with femoral anteversion, which causes her hips and feet to twist inward but does not require her to use a wheelchair in her daily life. She started playing wheelchair basketball with the Chicago Park District's Skyhawks team.

References

2004 births
Living people
People from Oak Lawn, Illinois
American women's wheelchair basketball players
Paralympic wheelchair basketball players of the United States
Wheelchair basketball players at the 2020 Summer Paralympics
Medalists at the 2020 Summer Paralympics
Paralympic medalists in wheelchair basketball
Paralympic bronze medalists for the United States
21st-century American women